Merthyr was an electoral district of the Legislative Assembly in the Australian state of Queensland from 1912 to 1992.

First created for the 1912 state election, the district was based in inner Brisbane centred on the suburb of New Farm, covering areas that previously belonged to the district of Fortitude Valley.

Merthyr was abolished by the 1991 redistribution, taking effect at the 1992 state election. Most of its territory was absorbed into the electorate of Brisbane Central with parts also added to the new district of Clayfield.

Members for Merthyr

Election results

See also
 Electoral districts of Queensland
 Members of the Queensland Legislative Assembly by year
 :Category:Members of the Queensland Legislative Assembly by name

References

Former electoral districts of Queensland
1912 establishments in Australia
1992 disestablishments in Australia
Constituencies established in 1912
Constituencies disestablished in 1992